Enrique Cahen Salaberry (born 12 October 1911 – 29 June 1991 in Buenos Aires) was a prolific Argentine film director whose career in the Cinema of Argentina as a movie director spanned five decades.

He directed some 60 films between 1943 and 1986 such as Cuidado Con Las Mujeres in 1951, winning a Premio ACE Award Best Cinema Director in 1971.

Filmography
Assistant director

 Crimen a las 3 (1935)
 Escala en la ciudad (1935)
 La fuga (1937)
 Puerta cerrada (1938)
 Nace un amor (1938)
 The Life of Carlos Gardel (1939)
 El Loco Serenata (1939)
 La casa del recuerdo (1939)
 Napoleón (1941)
 Orquesta de señoritas (1941)
 The Song of the Suburbs (1941)
 Soñar no cuesta nada (1941)
 Bajó un ángel del cielo (1942)
 El profesor Cero (1942)
 La mentirosa (1942)
 Claro de luna (1942)
 El tercer beso (1942)
 Son cartas de amor (1943)

Director

 Su hermana menor (1943)
 Su esposa diurna (1944)
 El Capitán Pérez (1946)
 Lauracha (1946)
 Un ángel sin pantalones (1947)
 Rodríguez supernumerario (1948)
 Recuerdos de un ángel (1948)
 Avivato (1948)
 El ladrón canta boleros (1950)
 Don Fulgencio (1950)
 El heroico Bonifacio (1951)
 Cuidado con las mujeres (1951)
 Concierto de bastón (1951)
 Especialista en señoras (1951)
 Mi mujer está loca (1952)
 El infortunado Fortunato (1952)
 Fin de mes (1953)
 Sucedió en Buenos Aires (1954)
 Mi viudo y yo (1954)
 En carne viva (1955)
 La dama del millón (1956)
 Enigma de mujer (1956)
 El bote, el río y la gente (1960)
 El turista (1963)
 Psique y sexo (1965)
 Como te extraño (1966)
 El Galleguito de la cara sucia (1966)
 La muchachada de abordo (1966)
 Story of a Poor Young Man (1968)
 El día que me quieras (1969)
 En una playa junto al mar (1971)
 El caradura y la millonaria (1971)
 Las píldoras (1972)
 Papá Corazón se quiere casar (1974)
 Hay que romper la rutina (1974)
 Mi novia el (1975)
 Maridos en vacaciones (1975)
 El gordo de América (1976)
 Los hombres piensan en eso (1976)
 Jacinta Pichimahuida (1977)
 Las turistas quieren guerra (1977)
 Yo también tengo fiaca (1978)
 Donde duermen dos duermen tres (1979)
 Gran Valor (1981)
 Los piolas no se casan (1981)
 Gran valor en la facultad de medicina (1981) 
 Mingo y Aníbal, dos pelotazos en contra (1984)
 Las Aventuras de Tremendo (1986)

External links
 

1911 births
1991 deaths
Argentine film directors
People from Buenos Aires